William Edmeads (dates unknown) was an English first-class cricketer who made a single appearance for Surrey in 1775. Edmeads scored 15 runs with a highest innings of 13. He did not bowl but held two catches. He was the younger brother of John Edmeads.

References

Bibliography
 

English cricketers
English cricketers of 1701 to 1786
Surrey cricketers
Year of birth unknown
Year of death unknown